The Tasmanian cutworm (Dasygaster padockina) is a moth of the family Noctuidae. It is found in Australia.

The larvae feed on various grasses.

External links
Australian Insects
ento.csiro.au

Hadeninae